Hayat Bakshi Begum (died 26 February, 1667) was the royal consort of Sultan Muhammad Qutb Shah, the sixth ruler of the Golconda Sultanate in south India. When her son Abdullah Qutb Shah was made sultan at the age of fourteen in 1626, she acted as regent for the first few years of his reign, and continued to wield considerable influence in the state until her death.

Biography

Early life 
She was the only daughter of Muhammad Quli Qutb Shah. Muhammad Quli Qutb Shah did not have any male heirs, and hence decided to wed his daughter to his nephew Sultan Muhammad Qutb Shah, and make him the heir to the throne.

She married Sultan Muhammad Qutb Shah in 1607. When Muhammad Quli Qutb Shah died on 16 January 1612, Sultan Muhammad Qutb Shah ascended the throne and Hayat Bakshi Begum became principal consort. Sultan Muhammad Qutb Shah often turned to Hayat for counsel.

Regent 

In 1626, Sultan Muhammad died, and Hayat had her son Abdullah Qutb Shah crowned. The new sultan was fourteen years old, and Hayat ruled as regent for the first few years of his reign, and would wield considerable influence in the kingdom until her death.

In 1656, she made a treaty with Mughal emperor Aurangzeb. According to the treaty, Abdullah's daughter would be married off to Mughal prince Muhammad Sultan and the Golconda Sultanate would be ceded to the Mughals after Abdullah's death.

She died on 26 February 1667. She was buried in a tomb within the Qutb Shahi tombs. Her tomb is the only woman's tomb which is equal in size to the tombs of the kings.

Legacy 
In 2019, IIT Hyderabad released a Virtual Reality film entitled Ma Saheba – The queen of Hyderabad, about Hayat Bakshi Begum.

References 

Qutb Shahi dynasty
1667 deaths
17th-century women rulers